Giora may refer to:

People

Given name

Giora Antman, Israeli footballer and coach
Giora Bernstein (born 1933), conductor, classical violinist, and Professor Emeritus of Music
Giora Eiland (born 1952), major general of the Israel Defense Forces 
Giora Epstein (born 1938), colonel in the Israeli Air Force 
Giora Feidman (born 1936), Argentinian-Jewish clarinetist 
Giora Godik, Jewish Israeli theater producer and impresario 
Giora Leshem (1940–2011), Israeli poet and translator 
Giora Romm (born 1945), deputy commander of the Israeli Air Force
Giora Schmidt (born 1983), American/Israeli violinist 
Giora Shanan (1908-2001), Israeli Palmach member
Giora Spiegel (born 1947), Israeli footballer and coach
Giora Yoseftal (1912–62), Israeli politician

Surname

Jonathan Bar Giora (born 1962), Israeli composer and pianist
Simon bar Giora (d. 70 CE), a leader of revolutionary forces during the First Jewish-Roman War in the 1st century Judea

Organizations
Bar-Giora (organization), a Jewish self-defense organization of the Second Aliyah

Places
Bar Giora, moshav in the Judean Mountains